Johannes Berger, O.E.S.A. (died 1481) was a Roman Catholic prelate who served as Auxiliary Bishop of Freising (1475–1481).

Biography
Johannes Berger was ordained a priest in the Order of Hermits of Saint Augustine in 1454. In 1475, he was appointed during the papacy of Pope Sixtus IV as Auxiliary Bishop of Freising and Titular Bishop of Belline. In 1478, he was consecrated bishop by Sixtus von Tannberg, Bishop of Freising. He served as Auxiliary Bishop of Freising until his death on 26 May 1481.

See also 
Catholic Church in Germany

References 

15th-century Roman Catholic bishops in Bavaria
Bishops appointed by Pope Sixtus IV
1481 deaths